Joeri Schroyen (born 18 January 1991) is a Dutch professional footballer who plays as a left winger for Eerste Divisie club Willem II.

Career
Schroyen took his first steps in professional football in the PSV youth academy. After a few seasons he moved to FC Eindhoven. He then joined Fortuna Sittard, where he also made his senior debut. That was on 24 September 2010, when the Limburgish team lost 2–1 at home to FC Volendam. Schroyen made an appearance as a starter. A left back during his early career, he scored his first goal on 30 October 2010, at home against Veendam. The following season he scored once again, this time against FC Den Bosch. On 16 November 2012, Schroyen made his 50th appearance for Fortuna, at home against Sparta Rotterdam (3–1 loss).

On 3 June 2013, Schroyen signed a contract with the recently promoted Eredivisie club Go Ahead Eagles for two years, with an option for a third year. However, he was mostly a reserve on the team. In January 2014, he was signed on a one and a half year contract by VVV-Venlo, of which the first six months were on a loan. On 24 January 2014, he made his debut for the Venlo club; when they won 1–0 away against Willem II. Schroyen came on as a substitute for Randy Wolters in the second half. In January 2015, Schroyen returned to Fortuna in a trade deal with Ramon Voorn, who had a disagreement with head coach Peter van Vossen. 

Schroyen made signed with MVV Maastricht as a free agent in the summer of 2016. There, he signed a two-year contract extension in June 2019.

On 2 February 2021, Schroyen signed with Greek club Xanthi on a one-and-a-half-year deal.

He returned to VVV-Venlo in July 2021 on a two-year contract, with an option of an additional year. The following year, on 7 July 2022, Schroyen joined Willem II.

References

External links
 

1991 births
Footballers from Limburg (Netherlands)
Sportspeople from Weert
Living people
Association football fullbacks
Association football wingers
Dutch footballers
PSV Eindhoven players
FC Eindhoven players
Fortuna Sittard players
Go Ahead Eagles players
VVV-Venlo players
MVV Maastricht players
Xanthi F.C. players
Willem II (football club) players
Eredivisie players
Eerste Divisie players
Super League Greece 2 players
Dutch expatriate footballers
Expatriate footballers in Greece
Dutch expatriate sportspeople in Greece